Kaestlea laterimaculata is a species of skink found in India.

References

Kaestlea
Reptiles described in 1887
Taxa named by George Albert Boulenger